Roley is both a given name and a surname. 

Notable people with the given name include:
 Roley Williams (1927–1999), Welsh professional footballer
 Roley Young, Australian rugby league footballer

Fictional characters with the given name include:
 Roley, a character from the British children's series Bob the Builder
 Roley, character from Dot in Space

People with the surname include:
 V. Vance Roley, Dean of the Shidler College of Business at the University of Hawaii

Masculine given names